Alderdice is a surname. Notable people with the surname include:

Alfred Alderdice, American actor with the stage name Tom Drake
Craig Alderdice, Australian rules footballer
David Alderdice, mayor of Belfast
Frederick C. Alderdice, Prime Minister of Newfoundland
John Alderdice, Baron Alderdice, Northern Ireland politician
Scott Alderdice, Australian writer and director

See also
Alderdice Peak
Allardice
Allardyce

English-language surnames
Patronymic surnames
Surnames of Scottish origin